Stack is a surname of English origin and is commonly found in county Kerry, Ireland. Variants of the name Stack include Stace, Stacey, Stacy, Stacke and De Staic. It is a baptismal name meaning "Son of Eustace", a Roman name of great antiquity.

Notable persons with this name include:
Aindrias Stack (born 1978), Irish actor and musician
Annie Stack (1894–??), Australian woman
Anthony Stack (born 1961), Canadian general
Austin Stack (1879–1929), Irish republican and politician
Balaram Stack (born 1991), American surfer
Brennan Stack (born 1988), Australian rules footballer
Brian P. Stack (born 1966), American politician
Brian Stack (born 1967), American actor, comedian and writer
Carol Stack (born 1940), American anthropologist
Charles Stack (disambiguation), multiple people
Chelle Stack (born 1973), American gymnast
Chris Stack, American actor
Claudia Stack (born 1966), American educator, writer, documentarian and film producer
David Stack (1957–1976), American murder victim
Eddie Stack (1887–1958), American baseball player
Edmund J. Stack (1874–1957), U.S. Representative from Illinois
Edward Stack (disambiguation), multiple people
Ella Stack (born 1929), Australian doctor and politician
Frank Stack (born 1937), American cartoonist
Gael Stack (born 1941), American artist
George Stack (born 1946), Irish Roman Catholic archbishop
Graham Stack (disambiguation), multiple people
Harvey G. Stack (1928–2022), American numismatist
Jack Stack, American businessman
James S. Stack (1852–1920), American politician
James West Stack (1835–1919), New Zealand clergyman and author
Jim Stack, American basketball executive
John Stack (disambiguation)
Jonathan Stack (born 1957), American documentary filmmaker
Joseph Stack, American who flew an aircraft into an Austin, Texas building to attack the IRS
Kelli Stack (born 1988), American ice hockey player
Lee Stack (1868–1924), British army officer and administrator
Mary Bagot Stack (1883–1935), Irish fitness pioneer
Michael J. Stack (1888–1960), American politician
Mike Stack (born 1963), American politician
Neville Stack (1919–1994), senior Royal Air Force commander
Oisín Stack, Irish actor
Peggy Fletcher Stack, American journalist and writer
Philip Stack (1900–1948), American poet
Phil Stack, Australian musician
Prunella Stack (1914–2010), British fitness pioneer and women's rights activist
Richard Stack (died 1812), Irish author
Robert Stack (1919–2003), American actor and television host
Ryan Stack (born 1975), American basketball player
Seán Stack (born 1953), Irish hurler
Stephen Stack, Irish Gaelic footballer
Steven Stack, American sociologist
Timothy Stack (born 1956), American actor and screenwriter
Tommy Stack (born 1945), Irish jockey
William Stack (1882–1949), American actor

Surnames of English origin